Stephen Poulter may refer to:

 Stephen Poulter (cricketer) (born 1956), former English cricketer
 Stephen Poulter (swimmer) (born 1961), British swimmer